Kaino may refer to:

Geography
Kaino (Crete), a town of ancient Crete
Kaino-hama Beach, Antarctic beach

People
given name
Kaino Lempinen (1921 – 2003), Finnish gymnast 
Kaino Thomsen (born 1991), Samoan taekwondo practitioner

surname
Boaz Kipchumba Kaino, Kenyan politician
Glenn Kaino (born 1972), American conceptual artist
, Japanese professional baseball player
Jerome Kaino (born 1983), New Zealand rugby union player

See also
Kainos